Medusa is a Kurt Austin novel, of the series NUMA Files.  This book is the eighth of that series.  The hardcover edition was released June 2, 2009.  Other editions of this book were released on other dates.

Plot
This novel centers around the exploits of Clive Cussler's characters Kurt Austin and Joe Zavala. These two and other members of NUMA respond to several mysterious incidents.  One is the sudden disappearance of an underwater lab conducting experiments on a rare jellyfish (the Blue Medusa (Cyanea lamarckii?)), an attack on a bathysphere that almost kills passenger Zavala and an attempt to kidnap a Chinese scientist at a remote lab in the Florida Keys.  The NUMA team seeks to discover who is behind these incidents.  They discover a criminal organization based in China that is conducting unethical medical experiments on humans and intends to create a deadly virus that it will threaten to unleash in an attempt to blackmail the world into surrendering to its whims.

Reviews
As of September, 2021 nine-hundred-eighty-two customer reviews of Medusa were on the Amazon.com website.  The book was given an average of 4 1/2 stars out of a possible five by reviewers.

References

2009 American novels
Novels by Clive Cussler
G. P. Putnam's Sons books
The NUMA Files
Collaborative novels